Muritapua is one of 22 islands in the Aitutaki atoll of the Cook Islands. It is a small islet located on the eastern perimeter of Aitutaki Lagoon between the larger islands of Akaiami and Tekopua, six kilometres to the southeast of the main island of Aitutaki. The island is 360m long and 150m wide.

References

Islands of Aitutaki